Paradiplosis is a genus of gall midges, insects in the family Cecidomyiidae. There are at least four described species in Paradiplosis.

Species
These four species belong to the genus Paradiplosis:
 Paradiplosis abietispectinatae (Tubeuf, 1930) c g
 Paradiplosis manii (Inouye, 1959) c g
 Paradiplosis obesa (Felt, 1907) i c g
 Paradiplosis tumifex Gagne, 1978 i c g b (balsam gall midge)
Data sources: i = ITIS, c = Catalogue of Life, g = GBIF, b = Bugguide.net

References

Further reading

 
 
 
 
 

Cecidomyiinae
Cecidomyiidae genera
Articles created by Qbugbot